Showstoppers is an album by singer-songwriter Barry Manilow, released in 1991. It was his first album to not feature any original music.

Track listing
"Give My Regards to Broadway (from Little Johnny Jones) - 1:08 (George M. Cohan)
"Overture of Overtures" - 4:11
"All I Need is the Girl" (from Gypsy) - 2:50 (Jule Styne, Stephen Sondheim)
"Real Live Girl" (from Little Me) - 3:26 (Cy Coleman, Carolyn Leigh, Neil Simon)
"Where or When" (from Babes in Arms) - 4:28 (Richard Rodgers, Lorenz Hart)
"Look to the Rainbow" [duet with Barbara Cook] (from Finian's Rainbow) - 4:31 (Burton Lane, E.Y. Harbourg)
"Once in Love With Amy" (from Where's Charley?) - 4:19 (Frank Loesser)
"Dancing in the Dark" (from The Band Wagon) - 3:21 (Howard Dietz, Arthur Schwartz)
"You Can Have the TV" (from Notes) - 2:48 (Craig Carnelia)
"I'll Be Seeing You" (from Right This Way) - 3:14 (Irving Kahal, Sammy Fain)
"But the World Goes 'Round" (from And the World Goes 'Round) - 3:52 (John Kander, Fred Ebb)
"Fugue for Tinhorns" [trio with Michael Crawford & Hinton Battle] (from Guys and Dolls) - 2:47 (Loesser)
"Luck Be a Lady" (from Guys and Dolls) - 2:15 (Loesser)
"Old Friends" (from Merrily We Roll Along) - 1:09 (Sondheim)
"The Kid Inside" (from Is There Life After High School?) - 3:59 (Carnelia)
"Never Met a Man I Didn't Like" (from The Will Rogers Follies) - 4:59 (Coleman/Betty Comden, Adolph Green)
"Bring Him Home" (from Les Misérables) - 3:46 (Claude-Michel Schönberg, Alain Boublil, Herbert Kretzmer)
"If We Only Have Love" (from Jacques Brel is Alive and Well and Living in Paris) - 3:51 (Jacques Brel)

References

Showstoppers
1991 albums
Arista Records albums